A giant isopod is any of the almost 20 species of large isopods, crustaceans distantly related to shrimp and crabs, which are decapods, in the genus Bathynomus. They are abundant in the cold, deep waters of the Atlantic, Pacific, and Indian Oceans.  Bathynomus giganteus, the species upon which the generitype is based, is often considered the largest isopod in the world, though other comparably poorly known species of Bathynomus may reach a similar size (e.g., B. kensleyi). The giant isopods are noted for their resemblance to the much smaller common woodlouse (pill bug), to which they are related. 

French zoologist Alphonse Milne-Edwards was the first to describe the genus in 1879 after his colleague Alexander Agassiz collected a juvenile male B. giganteus from the Gulf of Mexico. This was an exciting discovery for both scientists and the public, as at the time the idea of a lifeless or "azoic" deep ocean had only recently been refuted by the work of Sir Charles Wyville Thomson and others. No females were recovered until 1891.

Giant isopods are of little interest to most commercial fisheries, but are infamous for attacking and destroying fish caught in trawls. Specimens caught in the Americas and Japan are sometimes seen in public aquariums.

Description

Their morphology resembles that of their terrestrial relative, the woodlouse. Their bodies are dorsoventrally compressed, protected by a rigid, calcareous exoskeleton composed of overlapping segments. Like some woodlice, they also possess the ability to curl up into a "ball", where only the tough shell is exposed. This provides protection from predators trying to strike at the more vulnerable underside. The first shell segment is fused to the head; the most posterior segments are often fused, as well, forming a "caudal shield" over the shortened abdomen (pleon). 

The large eyes are compound with nearly 4,000 facets, sessile, and spaced far apart on the head. They have two pairs of antennae. The uniramous thoracic legs or pereiopods are arranged in seven pairs, the first of which is modified into maxillipeds to manipulate and bring food to the four sets of jaws. The abdomen has five segments called pleonites, each with a pair of biramous pleopods. These are modified into swimming legs and rami, flat respiratory structures acting as gills. The isopods are a pale lilac or pinkish in colour.

The individual species generally resemble each other, but can be separated by various morphological features, notably the number (7–13) and shape (straight or upturned) of the spines on the pleotelson ("tail"), shape  (simple or bifid) of the central spine on the pleotelson, and the shape and structure of the uropods and pereopods.

Range
Giant isopods have been recorded in the West Atlantic from the US state of Georgia to Brazil, including the Gulf of Mexico and the Caribbean. The four known Atlantic species are B. obtusus, B. miyarei, B. maxeyorum, and B. giganteus, and the last of these is the only species recorded off the United States. The remaining Bathynomus species are all restricted to the Indo-Pacific. 

No species occur in both the Atlantic and Indo-Pacific. Previous records of B. giganteus from the Indo-Pacific are now considered misidentifications of other species. Giant isopods are not known from the East Atlantic or East Pacific. The greatest species richness (five species) is found off eastern Australia, but it is possible other regions that are not as well-sampled match this figure. In general, the distributions of giant isopods are imperfectly known, and undescribed species may exist.

Ecology

Giant isopods are important scavengers in the deep-sea benthic environment.

In regions with both "giant" and "supergiant" species, the former mainly live on the continental slope, while the latter mainly live on the bathyal plain.

In contrast, preliminary studies indicate that B. doederleinii stops feeding when the temperature falls below . This lower temperature limit may explain their absence from temperate and frigid regions where seas at the depth preferred by Bathynomus often are colder. They are thought to prefer a muddy or clay substrate and lead solitary lives.

Although generalist scavengers, these isopods are mostly carnivorous and feed on dead whales, fish, and squid. They may also prey on slow-moving animals such as sea cucumbers, sponges, radiolarians, nematodes, and other zoobenthos, and perhaps even live fish. They are known to attack trawl catches. One giant isopod was filmed attacking a larger dogfish shark in a deepwater trap by latching onto and eating the animal's face. This footage was aired during the 2015 episode of Shark Week called "Alien Sharks: Close Encounters". 

As food is scarce in the deep-ocean biome, giant isopods must make take advantage of whatever food they have available. They are adapted to long periods of famine and have been known to survive over 5 years without food in captivity. When a significant source of food is encountered, giant isopods gorge themselves to the point that they could barely move. A study examining the digestive system contents of 1651 specimens of B. giganteus found that fish were most commonly eaten, followed by cephalopods and decapods, particularly carideans and galatheids.

Giant isopods collected along the east coast of Australia by setting traps exhibit a variation in diversity with water depth. The deeper the water, the fewer number of species found, and the larger the species tended to be. The giant isopods found in very deep waters off Australia were compared to those found off Mexico and India. From the fossil record, Bathynomus is thought to have existed more than 160 million years ago, so it did not evolve independently in all three locations, but since then  Bathynomus likely would show divergent evolution in the various locations. However, the giant isopods in all three locations are almost identical in appearance (although some differences are seen, and they are separate species). This reduced phenotypic divergence is linked to the extremely low light levels of their habitat.

Reproduction
A study of the seasonal abundance of B. giganteus juveniles and adults suggests a peak in reproductive capacity in the spring and winter. This is observed to be due to a shortage of food during the summer. Mature females develop a brood pouch or marsupium when sexually active, the pouch being formed by overlapping oostegites or brood plates grown from the medial border of the pereiopods. The young isopods emerge from the marsupium as miniatures of the adults, known as mancae. This is not a larval stage; the mancae are fully developed, lacking only the last pair of pereiopods.

Fossilized species
Fossilized specimens of Bathynomus are known extending back to at least the Early Oligocene (Rupelian) of Italy, with other fossils being known from Japan and Spain.

References

External links

Cymothoida
Extant Miocene first appearances
Isopod genera
Taxa named by Alphonse Milne-Edwards